Sate is a village and gram panchayat in India, situated in the Mawal taluka of Pune district in the state of Maharashtra.

Administration
The village is administrated by a sarpanch, an elected representative who leads a gram panchayat. At the time of the 2011 Census of India, the village was the headquarters for the eponymous gram panchayat, which also governed the villages of Mohitewadi and Sangavi.

Demographics
At the 2011 census, the village comprised 324 households. The population of 1772 was split between 897 males and 875 females.

See also
List of villages in Mawal taluka

References

Villages in Mawal taluka
Gram Panchayats in Pune district